Eva Krížiková (July 15, 1934 – March 31, 2020) was a Slovak film and stage actress, often celebrated as one of the greatest entertainers ever in her country of origin and The First Lady of Slovak Humor, respectively. Apart from her cinematic achievements, her name was credited in over five hundred productions made for television.

Filmography

The filmography of Eva Krížiková chronicles her film work through the artist's 60 years as a motion picture actress.  She initially entered the film industry through a minor, backup role in Paľo Bielik's work The Mountains Are Stirring  from 1952. Her first starring role came shortly after that, in Friday the 13th (1953), also by Bielik. However she has been cast in only eighteen feature films in total, her name has been credited in over five hundred productions made for television, one-hundred-thirty-three of which represent TV films and/or series.

Awards

See also
 List of Slovak films
 3rd Czech Lion Awards — Best Design Achievement nomination (V erbu lvice)
 18th Berlin International Film Festival — Silver Bear Award (L'homme qui ment)
 42nd Venice International Film Festival — Sergio Trasatti Award (Perinbaba)

References
General

Specific

External links

 Eva Krížiková at SND
 Eva Krížiková at ČSFd
 
 Eva Krížiková at SFd
 Eva Krížiková at FilmovaMista.cz
 Eva Krížiková at KinoBox
 Eva Krížiková at Osobnosti.sk

1934 births
2020 deaths
Actors from Bratislava
Slovak stage actresses
Slovak film actresses
Slovak television actresses
Recipients of Medal of Merit (Czech Republic)
Recipients of the Pribina Cross
20th-century Slovak actresses
21st-century Slovak actresses